Margaret Clitherow (1556 – 25 March 1586) was an English saint and martyr of the Roman Catholic Church, known as "the Pearl of York". She was pressed to death for refusing to enter a plea to the charge of harbouring Catholic priests. She was canonised in 1970 by Pope Paul VI.

Life
Margaret Clitherow was born in 1556, one of five children of Thomas and Jane Middleton. Her father was a respected businessman, a wax-chandler and Sheriff of York in 1564, who died when Margaret was fourteen. In 1571, she married John Clitherow, a wealthy butcher and a chamberlain of the city, and bore him three children; the family lived at today's 10–11 The Shambles.

She converted to Roman Catholicism in 1574. Although her husband, John Clitherow, belonged to the Established Church, he was supportive as his brother William was a Roman Catholic priest. He paid her fines for not attending church services. She was first imprisoned in 1577 for failing to attend church, and two more incarcerations at York Castle followed. Her third child, William, was born in prison.

Margaret risked her life by harbouring and maintaining priests, which was made a capital offence by the Jesuits, etc. Act 1584. She provided two chambers, one adjoining her house and, with her house under surveillance, she rented a house some distance away, where she kept priests hidden and Mass was celebrated through the thick of the persecution. Her home became one of the most important hiding places for fugitive priests in the north of England. Local tradition holds that she also housed her clerical guests in The Black Swan at Peasholme Green, where the Queen's agents were lodged.

She sent her older son, Henry, to the English College, relocated in Reims, to train for the priesthood. Her husband was summoned by the authorities to explain why his oldest son had gone abroad, and in March 1586 the Clitherow house was searched. A frightened boy revealed the location of the priest hole.

Margaret was arrested and called before the York assizes for the crime of harbouring Catholic priests. She refused to plead, thereby preventing a trial that would entail her three children being made to testify, and being subjected to torture. She was sentenced to death. Although pregnant with her fourth child, she was executed on Lady Day, 1586, (which also happened to be Good Friday that year) in the Toll Booth at Ouse Bridge, by being crushed to death by her own door, the standard inducement to force a plea.

The two sergeants who should have carried out the execution hired four desperate beggars to do it instead. She was stripped and had a handkerchief tied across her face then laid across a sharp rock the size of a man's fist, the door from her own house was put on top of her and loaded with an immense weight of rocks and stones so that the sharp rock would break her back. Her death occurred within fifteen minutes, but her body was left for six hours before the weight was removed.

Veneration
Clitherow was beatified in 1929 by Pope Pius XI and canonised on 25 October 1970 by Pope Paul VI among the Forty Martyrs of England and Wales. Their feast day in the current Roman Catholic calendar is 4 May in England and 25 October in Wales. She is also commemorated in England on 30 August, along with martyrs Anne Line and Margaret Ward. The three were officially added to the Episcopal Church liturgical calendar with a feast day on 30 August.

A relic, said to be her hand, is housed in the Bar Convent in York.

St. Margaret's Shrine is at 35–36 The Shambles. John Clitherow had his butcher's shop at 35. However, the street was re-numbered in the 18th century, so it is thought their house was actually opposite.

Legacy

Margaret Clitherow is the patroness of the Catholic Women's League.
Church - Saint Margaret Clitherow - Grahame Park, Colindale London. Several schools in England are named after her, including those in Bracknell, Brixham, Manchester, Middlesbrough, Thamesmead SE28, Brent, London NW10 and Tonbridge. The Roman Catholic primary school in Nottingham's Bestwood estate is named after Clitherow. In the United States, St Margaret of York Church and School in Loveland, a suburb of Cincinnati, Ohio, is also named after her. Another school named after her is St Margaret Clitherow RC Primary School, located next to Stevenage Borough Football Club. 

The Local catholic secondary school, All Saints, has a form named after the martyr, and since it shares its chapel with the Bar Convent also houses her left hand, the school was the first English school founded exclusively to educate catholic girls, so fulfills St Margaret Clitherow's ambition to educate in the word of God, she associated with the virtue of Truth.

She is a co-patroness of the Latin Mass Society, which organises an annual pilgrimage to York in her honour. A group of parishes in the Roman Catholic Archdiocese of Liverpool, Sacred Heart in Hindsford, St Richard's in Atherton, Holy Family in Boothstown, St Ambrose Barlow in Astley, St Gabriel's, Higher Folds in Leigh are now united as a single community with St Margaret Clitherow as its patron. The former Parishes of Sacred Heart and Holy Family in Rochdale in the Diocese of Salford have also been united under the patronage of St Margaret.

The English poet and Jesuit priest Gerard Manley Hopkins wrote a poem honouring "God's daughter Margaret Clitheroe." The poem, entitled "Margaret Clitheroe" was among fragments and unfinished poems of Hopkins discovered after his death and is a tribute to the woman, to her faith and courage, and to the manner of her death.

In 2008, a commemorative plaque was installed at the Micklegate end of York's Ouse Bridge to mark the site of her martyrdom; the Bishop of Middlesbrough unveiled it in a ceremony on 29 August 2008.

In 2014, the futuristic dystopian novel I Am Margaret by Corinna Turner was first published in English. The author cited St. Margaret Clitherow as a major influence (along with the 2010 film adaptation of Never Let Me Go, the 2005 novel by Kazuo Ishiguro, and the Young Adult fiction series The Hunger Games by Suzanne Collins). At one point the novel was even marked by a US publisher as “a retelling of Saint Margaert Clitherow’s story.” However, although the titular heroine Margaret lives in an age of religious persecution, with some elements such as ‘pursuivants’ drawing recognizably on the Elizabethan penal times, the author has stated that it is not a strict retelling and was not intended to be. The novel was a finalist in the CALA Awards 2016 and another book in the series was nominated for the CILIP Carnegie Medal Award 2016. The novel has since been translated into Italian and a stage adaptation by Catholic novelist Fiorella de Maria was published in 2020.

See also
Bar Convent
Forty Martyrs of England and Wales
Saint Margaret Clitherow, patron saint archive

Further reading 
Peter Lake and Michael Questier, 2011, The Trials of Margaret Clitherow: Persecution, Martyrdom and the Politics of Sanctity in Elizabethan England: New York/London: Continuum

References

English saints
English Roman Catholic saints
Converts to Roman Catholicism from Anglicanism
Yorkshire saints
Canonizations by Pope Paul VI
Forty Martyrs of England and Wales
People from York
1556 births
1586 deaths
Executed English women
16th-century Roman Catholic martyrs
16th-century Christian saints
16th-century English women
People executed by torture
People executed under Elizabeth I
Executed people from North Yorkshire
Christian female saints of the Early Modern era
Anglican saints